Tfaya is a sweet sauce in Moroccan cuisine made with caramelized onions, raisins, cinnamon, and honey. It is often served on couscous.

References 

Moroccan cuisine
Sauces